Axel Gade  (28 May 1860 – 9 November 1921) was a Danish violinist, composer and conductor. He was the son of Niels Wilhelm Gade.

Notable works
Violin concerto No. 1 in D minor (1889)
Violin concerto Op. 10, No. 2 in F major (1899)
Venezias Nat (opera 1919)
Lisette (opera 1921)
Trio in c minor for piano, violin and cello
Sonata in G major for piano and violin
David's 23rd psalm
music for oboe
some songs

See also
List of Danish composers

References
This article was initially translated from the Danish Wikipedia.

External links
 
 

Danish composers
Male composers
Danish classical violinists
Male classical violinists
1860 births
1921 deaths